Thomas Francis Magner (March 8, 1860 – December 22, 1945) was an American lawyer and politician who served three terms as a U.S. Representative from New York from 1889 to 1895.

He was an uncle of John Francis Carew.

Biography 
Born in Brooklyn, New York, Magner attended the public schools. He graduated from St. Xavier College in 1880 and from Columbia University, New York City, in 1882. He taught in a public school in Brooklyn. He studied law. He was admitted to the bar in 1883 and commenced practice in Brooklyn, New York, the same year.

Political career 
He was a member of the New York State Assembly (Kings Co., 6th D.) in 1888.

Congress 
Magner was elected as a Democrat to the 51st, 52nd and 53rd United States Congresses, holding office from March 4, 1889, to March 3, 1895.

Later career and death 
He resumed the practice of law, and served as corporation counsel of the Borough of Brooklyn from 1913 to 1917.

He died, after a long illness, in the Hotel Bossert, Brooklyn, New York on December 22, 1945. He was interred in Holy Cross Cemetery.

Sources

1860 births
1945 deaths
Columbia University alumni
People from Brooklyn
Democratic Party members of the New York State Assembly
Democratic Party members of the United States House of Representatives from New York (state)